Augustus King George (16 July 1817 – 6 February 1902) was an English first-class cricketer.

George was born at Enfield in October 1817. He made his debut in first-class cricket for the Marylebone Cricket Club against Surrey at Lord's in 1844. He played first-class cricket until 1849, making 26 appearances. In addition to playing for the Marylebone Cricket Club, he also appeared for the Gentlemen of Kent, England, the Gentlemen of England, and for the Fast bowlers in the Fast v South match of 1849. He scored 253 runs in his 26 first-class matches, at an average of 6.17 and a high score of 33. He died at Brighton in February 1902.

References

External links

1817 births
1902 deaths
People from Enfield, London
English cricketers
Marylebone Cricket Club cricketers
Gentlemen of Kent cricketers
Non-international England cricketers
Gentlemen of England cricketers
Fast v Slow cricketers